Breaking Points with Krystal and Saagar (or simply Breaking Points) (BP) is an American populist, anti-establishment political news and opinion series created and hosted by Krystal Ball and Saagar Enjeti. It was launched in June 2021 by Ball and Enjeti, both former hosts of The Hills Rising web series. The series is available both on YouTube and as an audio-only podcast format. Its format includes one populist left anchor (Ball) and one populist right anchor (Enjeti), who give views from both sides of the political spectrum.

Format 
Breaking Points features commentary and analysis of political news and current events, in-studio interviews with journalists, politicians, campaign staff and surrogates, political advisors and strategists, and members of the news media, and occasional live-analysis segments. It is usually published on Mondays, Tuesdays, and Thursdays.

The "Breaking Points" segments serve as an opportunity for each host to highlight an important topic in current events. The hosts analyze the topic in a monologue format, usually organized into three or four bullet-points. This is followed by an open discussion, available to premium subscribers.

Breaking Points spends a substantial amount of its time criticizing mainstream media from a populist perspective.

Business model 
The majority of the show's revenue comes from premium subscribers, with some additional revenues from YouTube and podcast ads. Their expenses are around one million dollars a year.

History 
On May 28, 2021, Krystal Ball and Saagar Enjeti announced their departure from The Hill'''s Rising. On June 7, 2021, the first episode of Breaking Points was uploaded to YouTube.

Ball & Enjeti have spoken about subtle pressure they experienced working under The Hill's corporate umbrella when choosing topics to cover & the angles used in their coverage there. These anecdotes match their thesis about how power is wielded in Washington. With BP, they sought to free themselves of any such corporate influence. They gained complete editorial control over their work. They also lost access to certain resources they enjoyed at Rising, such as a small network of field reporters and regular field hits with members of Congress from inside the Capitol dome. 

It also gave the hosts of September 2022, former Rising hosts Ryan Grim and Emily Jashinsky also joined Breaking Points''. They co-host their own show, Counterpoints, as well as fill in on Breaking Points and co-host special coverage as needed.

References

External links 
 
 

Political mass media in the United States
Internet properties established in 2021